Final Combination (also known as Dead Connection) is a 1994 crime-thriller film  directed by Nigel Dick, and stars Michael Madsen and Lisa Bonet.

Plot
Detective Matt Dickson (Michael Madsen) is investigating a series of grisly murders committed in seedy motels across Los Angeles. He gets a break in the case when he realizes the killer (Gary Stretch) is consistently using the names of boxers for aliases. Meanwhile, reporter Catherine Briggs (Lisa Bonet) is also pursuing the serial killer, but for her own mysterious reasons. Matt and Catherine begin working together, but the investigation becomes complicated when they start having an affair.

Cast
 Michael Madsen as Detective  Matt Dickson
 Lisa Bonet as Catherine Briggs 
 Gary Stretch as Richard Welton 
 Tim Russ as Detective Chuck Rowland  
 Damian Chapa as Donato
 Carmen Argenziano as Lieutenant Stein
 Clarence Landry as Ike "Point Man" Pointer
 Susan Byun as Sara
 Parker Posey as Denise 
 Alan Toy as Art Robinson 
 Eric Da Re as Anthony, The Bouncer 
 Julio Oscar Mechoso as "Linen Suit"

References

External links

1994 crime thriller films
1994 films
American crime thriller films
Films scored by Rolfe Kent
Films directed by Nigel Dick
1990s English-language films
1990s American films